Charles Dickson may refer to:
 Charles Dickson, Lord Dickson (1850–1922), Scottish Unionist MP and judge
 Charles Dickson (merchant) (1746–1796), merchant, shipbuilder, farmer and politician in Nova Scotia
 Charles Dickson (soldier) (died c. 1784), soldier, land owner and politician in Nova Scotia
 Charles Wedderburn Dickson (1863–1934), member of the Executive Council and Legislative Council of Hong Kong

See also
 Charles Dickson Archibald (1802–1868), lawyer, businessman and political figure in Nova Scotia
 Charles Dixon (disambiguation)
 Charlie Dixon (disambiguation)